A litany is part of Christian liturgy.

Music
Compositional forms
Litany Tetrachord#Compositional forms
Classical music
Litany, composition by John Musto
Litany, composition by Arvo Pärt
Litany, composition by Toru Takemitsu
Litany, composition by Thomas Tallis
Litany, album by The Hilliard Ensemble
Litanies, organ composition by Jehan Alain
Popular music
Litany (album), by Vader

See also
Litani (disambiguation)
Litania (disambiguation)